The Eurovision Song Contest 1959 was the fourth edition of the annual Eurovision Song Contest, held on Wednesday 11 March 1959 at the  in Cannes, France, and hosted by French television presenter Jacqueline Joubert.

In total eleven countries participated in the contest, with  making its first appearance and the  returning after their absence the previous year. , however, decided not to participate after competing in all former editions.

Van Hemert also became the first individual to win twice, having also written the first Dutch winning song from 1957, "". The United Kingdom placed second, marking the first of a record sixteen times that the country would go on to finish as contest runners-up, while  placed third.

Location 

This marked the second occasion in which the previous year's winning country organised the event, and the first time in which the winning country was given first choice at hosting the following year's event, as the rights to host the 1958 contest were only awarded to the Netherlands after all other countries declined.

Format 
The contest was organised and broadcast by the French public broadcaster  (RTF) and was hosted by French television presenter Jacqueline Joubert. The stage constructed for the event featured three revolving platforms, each of which was segmented into four, similar to a revolving door, to include various backdrops. These backdrops were specific to each of the participating countries and featured scenery or objects associated with that country.

As in the 1957 and 1958 contests, each country, participating through a single EBU member broadcaster, was represented by one song performed by up to two people on stage. The results of the event were determined through jury voting, with each country's jury containing ten individuals who each gave one vote to their favourite song, with no abstentions allowed and with jurors unable to vote for their own country. One rule change implemented for this contest specified that individuals employed in the music industry were no longer allowed to be included among the national juries. Alongside the traditional reprise performance of the winning song, the second- and third-placed songs were also performed again, for the first and only time at the contest.

Participating countries 

A total of eleven countries competed in the contest, with  making its first appearance and the  returning after a one year absence. The United Kingdom's absence from the 1958 contest is generally reported to have been due to the country's poor result in 1957, but their return coincided with the international success of "", the Italian entry from the previous year's contest, and the appointment of Eric Maschwitz as Head of Light Entertainment at the BBC. Beginning with this event the United Kingdom holds the record for the longest string of consecutive appearances in the Eurovision Song Contest, appearing in every subsequent contest final .  was absent from the event, having participated in all previous contests, and appears to have decided against participating late in the preparations for the contest as the country was listed among the participants in several radio and television listings.

Conductors 
Each country was allowed to nominate their own musical director to lead the orchestra during the performance of their country's entry, with the host musical director, Franck Pourcel, also conducting for those countries which did not nominate their own conductor. The conductors listed below led the orchestra during the performance for the indicated countries.

 Franck Pourcel
 Kai Mortensen
 
 Franck Pourcel
 Dolf van der Linden
 Franck Pourcel
 Franck Pourcel
 Franck Pourcel
 Franck Pourcel
 Eric Robinson
 Francis Bay

Participants and results 

Among this year's participants, two artists had previously competed in the contest.

The Netherlands became the first country to achieve two victories in the event, and Van Hemert became the first individual to win the contest twice, after previously providing lyrics for the Netherlands' winner in 1957, "". The United Kingdom's result was the first of sixteen British entries to finish in second place, a contest record .

Detailed voting results 

The announcement of the results from each country was conducted in reverse order to that which each country performed.

Spokespersons 
Each country nominated a spokesperson who was responsible for announcing the votes for their respective country via telephone. Known spokespersons at the 1959 contest are listed below.

 Enzo Tortora

Broadcasts 

Each participating broadcaster was required to relay the contest via its television network. Broadcasters were able to send commentators to provide coverage of the contest in their own native language and to relay information about the artists and songs to their television viewers. Known details on the broadcasts in each country, including the specific broadcasting stations and commentators are shown in the table below.

References

Bibliography

External links 

 
1959
Music festivals in France
1959 in music
1959 in France
Events in Cannes
March 1959 events in Europe